Area codes 541 and 458 are telephone area codes in the North American Numbering Plan (NANP) for most of the U.S. state of Oregon, excluding only the northwestern corner of the state. The service area includes the cities of Eugene, Springfield, Corvallis, Albany, Medford, Bend, Ashland, Klamath Falls, The Dalles, Burns, Lakeview, and Pendleton, as well as the coastal region from Lincoln County to the California border. Area code 541 was created in an area code split from area code 503 on November 5, 1995. Area code 458 was added to the same service area on February 10, 2010 to form an overlay.

History
Area code 503 was used for the entire state of Oregon until November 5, 1995, when the numbering plan area was reduced to the just the populous northwestern corner of the state, including Portland and Salem, and area code 541 began service for the rest of the state. This was intended as a long-term solution, as northwest Oregon has the majority of Oregon's landlines and cell phones. However, by 2007, 541 was quickly exhausting central office codes, due to the proliferation of cell phones and pagers, particularly in Eugene, Corvallis and Medford.

To mitigate central office code exhaustion, the Oregon Public Utility Commission approved an overlay numbering plan with area code 458 for the entire area, resulting in mandatory 10-digit dialing for that area. Oregon's other area code overlay (503/971) already had this requirement. Ten-digit dialing was phased in beginning in July 2009, becoming mandatory in January 2010. The first exchange to be issued in the 458 area code was 205 in Eugene in August 2011.

The numbering plan area is divided among four local access and transport areas (LATAs). Most of the numbering plan area is part of the Portland LATA, while the southwest portion is the Eugene LATA. Malheur County is part of the Boise/southern Idaho LATA and the Quinn, Oregon, exchange, in the Reno/northern Nevada LATA, while part of northeast Oregon is in the Spokane, Washington LATA

541 central offices
Note: Certain rate centers in this area code serve more than one city, including:
 Eugene, Springfield
 Coos Bay, North Bend
 Redmond, Terrebonne
 Phoenix, Talent
 Grants Pass, Wilderville
 Oakland, Sutherlin
 Roseburg, Winchester
 Athena, Weston
 Cave Junction, Kerby

458 central offices

See also
List of NANP area codes

References

External links

541
541
1995 establishments in Oregon